The Companies Act 1985 (c. 6) is an Act of the Parliament of the United Kingdom of Great Britain and Northern Ireland, enacted in 1985, which enabled companies to be formed by registration, and set out the responsibilities of companies, their directors and secretaries. It has largely been superseded by the Companies Act 2006.

The Act was a consolidation of various other pieces of company legislation, and was one component of the rules governing companies in England and Wales and in Scotland. A company will also be governed by its own memorandum and articles of association.

Table A, which lays out default articles of association, was not included in the body of the Act, as it had been in all previous Companies Acts. Instead, it was introduced by statutory instrument - the Companies (Tables A to F) Regulations 1985.

The Act applied only to companies incorporated under it, or under earlier Companies Acts. Sole traders, partnerships, limited liability partnerships etc. were not governed by the Act.

Company law throughout the United Kingdom is now governed by the Companies Act 2006, which received Royal Assent on 8 November 2006, and which was commenced in stages between then and 1 October 2009.

Certain aspects of the Companies Act 1985 have not been replaced by the Companies Act 2006, and they will remain in force:
 company investigations
 orders imposing restrictions on shares following an investigation
 Scottish floating charges and receivers.

See also
Companies Act

References

External links

1985 in Scotland
United Kingdom Acts of Parliament 1985
Acts of the Parliament of the United Kingdom concerning England and Wales
United Kingdom company law
Acts of the Parliament of the United Kingdom concerning Scotland